Neisha (real name Neža Buh), born on January 5, 1982, in Ljubljana, is a Slovenian pianist and pop singer.

Being born into a music family, Neža's music talent were noticed during her childhood so she entered a music school (first in Cerkno, then in Škofja Loka) and continued at the Ljubljana Music and Ballet High School. As she was very successful at several contests in piano music and solfeggio, the school awarded her the Škerjanc Award in 2003. In 2000, she became a student of the Music Academy in Ljubljana.

Besides the classical music she collaborated with many commercial pop and rock artists (among others Terrafolk, Big Foot Mama) as an arranger, backup vocalist or keyboard player etc. Her solo  career started in 2005. Her first single,  (English version of this song was titled Straight to the Moon), was very well received among radio audience and due to great interest her first album, simply named Neisha, was released two weeks earlier than initially planned. During its first week, only a turbo folk band Atomik Harmonik sold more albums but by the end of the year  Neisha became Slovenian best sold album of 2005 although it was released in autumn. After 10 weeks of reigning the national record chart, many awards and several sold out concerts it was the best sold album of 2006 in Slovenia as well.

In 2007, Neisha released album, called Nor je ta svet (translated as This world is crazy), which was also quite successful. With her new album, Neisha continued performing in major Slovenian concert venues including such as Križanke and Cankarjev dom. She cooperated with regional big names starting with Kornelije Kovač, Vlado Kreslin, Gibonni, Massimo, Vlatko Stefanovski etc.

The year 2010 saw the release of Neisha's newest studio album named  Krila (translated as Wings). On this album she continued working with her longtime producer Dejan Radičević. The result was an album which sounded different from anything that Neisha did before. Songs are livelier, faster more intense.

Discography

Neisha: 2005
Record Label: Nika records, Music producer: Dejan Radičević

Track List:
 Le kaj se skriva…
 
 Malo tu malo tam
 Čarobni potep
 ‘Maš še kje čas?
 Najlepša pot
 Vsako popoldne
 The game U play
 Movin’ on
 The people we are
Bonus Tracks: 
 2 bad 2 sad (demo take)
 Straight to the moon
 Miles away

Neisha - Special Edition (Contains “live” recordings from Cankarjev Dom): 2006
Record Label: Nika records, Music producer: Dejan Radičević

Track List:
-CD1-
 Slab dan
 Le kaj se skriva…
 
 Malo tu malo tam
 Čarobni potep
 ‘Maš še kje čas?
 Najlepša pot
 Vsako popoldne
 The game U play
 Movin’ on
 The people we are
Bonus Tracks:
 2 bad 2 sad (demo take)
 Straight to the moon
 Miles away

-CD2-
 Le kaj se skriva…
 Čarobni potep
 ‘Maš še kje čas?
 Ne daj da gledam u nebo
 Get up
 Malo tu malo tam
  (unplugged from band rehearsal)
Bonus Track:
 Njen trenutek prihaja (feat. Vlado Kreslin)

Nor je ta svet: 2007
Record Label: Nika records, Music producer: Dejan Radičević

Track List:
 Zaradi upanja
 Vrtiljak
 Ogenj pod nogami
 Cvetni prah ljubezni
 Pod enim dežnikom
 Stokrat bolje mi je zdaj
 Občutek
 Vedno za vedno
 Nor je ta svet
 Midnight
 Blame me
 You and me

Miles away (English compilation ): 2009
Record Label: Dallas, Music producer: Dejan Radičević

Track List:
 My bit of sky
 Hey c’mon
 Straight to the moon
 Miles away
 Miles away
 If not for hope
 Country song
 Midnight
 Unstoppable
 You have it all
 Fun fair
 Feels like the first time in love
 Ljubav je domino (feat. Vlatko Stefanovski)

Krila: 2010
Record Label: Nika records, Music producer: Dejan Radičević

Track List:
 Pridejo časi
 Tiste lepe dni
 Krila
 Sanje na dražbi
 Alarm srca
 Veter
 Najin ples (feat. Tokac)
 Vzemi me
 Krila2
 Igra čustev
 Show must go
 Mesto
 Nekaj nujnega
Bonus:
 Občutek (performed by string quartet InQuartet)

External links

In Slovenian:
 Neisha's official site
 Introduction of Neisha as a Škerjanc awardee

1982 births
Living people
Slovenian pop singers
21st-century Slovenian women singers
Slovenian pianists
Musicians from Ljubljana
21st-century pianists
21st-century women pianists